Springfield High School is a public high school in Lakemore, Ohio, United States, just east of Akron.  It is the only high school in the Springfield Local School District and serves students living in Lakemore and Springfield Township.

Construction 
The current high school was built to replace the district's old high school. The building was constructed by Cavanaugh Building in 2013. The new high school cost $42 million to build, and was supposed to be opened in the fall of 2013, but due to structural issues on the second floor the opening was delayed. The school began operations in early 2014 and has been in use since.

Programs Offered 

 Springfield is affiliated with the Portage Lakes Career Center, which offers career programs to juniors and seniors attending Springfield High School.
 Springfield also offers a CCP (College Credit Plus) program to those attending its high school, giving them the ability to earn high school and college credits simultaneously.

Springfield High School Media Coverage 
Springfield High School has been the topic of several stories from local media outlets such as the Akron Beacon Journal. While the school is mainly subject to sports stories, some events at the school have gathered negative media attention.

 On May 7, 2015, four students were arrested by local law enforcement after they were caught having brought air-soft weapons into school. One of the weapons had the appearance of an SMG. No one was hurt during the incident, but the school was put into lock down mode for a while.
 William Burket, a teacher at Springfield High School, was charged in July 2017 for stealing teacher's union funds. In that same year, Mia Balazovich pleaded guilty to stealing $30,000 from a booster club from 2014 to 2016.
 In February 2020, the cafeteria served a "pizza burger" which consisted of a hamburger bun topped with meat sauce and shredded cheese. The "pizza burger" received mixed reviews, but disgusted some students to the point that they posted about it on social media. The school defended their lunch item by stating that they wanted to create new lunches for the students.

State championships

 Girls Softball – 1978, 1988, 1989, 1990, 1992, 1993, 1994, 1995, 2005

External links

Notes and references

Educational institutions in the United States with year of establishment missing
High schools in Summit County, Ohio
Public high schools in Ohio